The Réveillon riots between 26 and 29 April 1789 centered in the St. Antoine district of Paris where a factory which produced luxury wallpaper was owned by Jean-Baptiste Réveillon. The factory employed around 300 people. The riots were one of the first instances of violence during the French Revolution. The factory where the riot took place was unusual in pre-revolutionary France as the factory was guild-free in an era where guilds controlled quality standards.

Protests began after rumors spread that the owner had made a speech stating that workers, many of whom were highly skilled, were to be paid lower wages and, as a result, there would be lower prices. Workers were concerned with food shortages, high unemployment, and low wages after a difficult winter in 1789. However, Réveillon was known for his benevolence towards the poor and actually stated that bread prices should be brought down to those that people could afford (below 15 sous a day) but his comments were misinterpreted as wage restrictions. He made the comments on 21 April when the assembly of the Saint-Marguerite was discussing its Cahier which all Estates drew up before the Estates-General was to be called.

Though the first three marches - one of which targeted the Third Estate's Assembly of Electors - were resolved peacefully, confrontations between troops and participants in the fourth demonstration led to the outbreak of violence in the Faubourg Saint-Antoine that evening.

While the protesters did not manage to destroy the factory, which was being guarded by a group of around fifty troops, a factory owned by the saltpetre manufacturer Henriot was destroyed after he made similar comments. However Réveillon's factory was destroyed a day later as was his home. The riot killed 25 people and wounded around the same number although rumour caused the casualty figures to be exaggerated. The French Guard were used to restore order.

On the fantasy/crime drama Grimm, the Réveillon riots were noted in the fifth season in the episode Wesen Nacht to have been wesen-on-wesen violence.

See also
 List of food riots
 Estates General of 1789
 Cahiers de doléances

References
'The Oxford History of the French Revolution' by William Doyle 

 Micah Alpaugh, "The Politics of Escalation in French Revolutionary Protest: Political Demonstrations, Nonviolence and Violence in the Grandes journées of 1789," French History 23, no. 3 (Fall 2009), 336–359.

External links
An eyewitness account of the riot

1789 events of the French Revolution
Food riots
1789 riots
18th century in Paris
Labor disputes in France
18th-century scandals